The Japan–Korea Treaty of 1907 was made between the Empire of Japan and the Korean Empire in 1907. Negotiations were concluded on July 24, 1907.

Treaty provisions
The treaty provided that Korea should act under the guidance of a Japanese resident general.  The effect of the treaty's provisions was that the administration of internal affairs was turned over to Japan.

The Korean Empire had become a protectorate of Japan under the terms of the earlier Eulsa Treaty on 1905, and had thus lost the right to conduct diplomatic exchanges with other countries. Korean Emperor Gojong sent an envoy in secret to the Hague Conference on World Peace to protest Japan's actions. In retaliation, on July 18, 1907, Japan made Emperor Gojong abdicate in favor of his son Sunjong.

Six days later, a new agreement was forced on the Korean government. Provisions in this new treaty gave the Japanese Resident-General the right to appoint and dismiss high-ranking officials (article 4) and stipulated that all high-ranking officials appointed to the Korean government must be Japanese (article 5). This brought the internal government of Korea fully under the control of Japan. The unpublished section of the treaty also placed the Korean army under Japanese leadership, and handed over judicial and policing powers.

Translation of full text
"The Governments of Japan and Korea, with a view to the early attainment of prosperity and strength in Korea and the speedy promotion of the welfare of the Korean people, have agreed upon and concluded the follow stipulations:

 Article I. The Government of Korea shall follow the directions of the Resident General in connection with the reform of administration.
 Article II. Korea shall not enact any law or ordinance or carry out any administrative measure unless it has previous approval of the Resident General.
 Article III. The judicial affairs of Korea shall be kept distinct from ordinary administrative affairs.
 Article IV. No appointment or dismissal of Korean officials of high grade shall be made without the consent of the Resident General.
 Article V. Korea shall appoint to official positions such Japanese as are recommended by the Resident General.
 Article VI. Korea shall not engage any foreigner without the consent of the Resident general.
 Article VII. The first clause of the agreement between Japan and Korea, dated Aug 22, 1904, is hereby abrogated."

 Lord Itō Hirobumi [Marquess], Resident-General, July 24, 40th year of the Meiji era [1907] (seal)
 Sir Lee Wan-Yong, Prime Minister, July 24, 11th year of the Gwangmu era [1907] (seal)

Diplomatic Memorandum (unpublished)
Based on the import of the Japan-Korea treaty of the 40th year of the Meiji era, the following items shall be enacted.

(1)　The following courts, composed of people from both Japan and Korea, shall be newly established.

 1 One  located in Gyeongseong Seoul or Suwon.

 2 Three 
One shall be located in the central region, and one each in the northern and southern regions.

 3 Eight 
The  and  shall be Japanese.
32 of all attorneys and 80 of all secretaries shall be Japanese, and shall be allocated as appropriate given the degree of work required.

 4 103 
Thesе are to be located in the locations of important 
One of the attorneys and one of the secretaries is to be Japanese.

(2) The following prisons shall be newly established.

 1 Nine prisons
One prison shall be located in the same area as each of the district courts, and one prison on one of the islands. The  shall be Japanese.

(3) Military forces shall be arranged as follows.

 The  of the army, assigned to guarding the Emperor and other duties, shall be disbanded.
 Educated  shall be assigned to the Japanese army for training in the field, except where it is necessary for them to remain in the Korean army.
 Appropriate provisions shall be made in Japan for training Korean soldiers to become officers.

  for each department
 The 
 One  and one 
 For the cabinet, several  and 
 For each department, several secretaries and assistant secretaries
 An  for each province
 One  for each province
 Several  for each province

The matter of other appointments of Japanese as officials in the areas of finance, policing and technology shall be set down by a later agreement.

See also
 Japan–Korea Treaty of 1904
 Japan–Korea Treaty of 1905
 Japan–Korea Treaty of 1910
 Anglo-Japanese Alliance
 Taft–Katsura Agreement
 Treaty of Portsmouth
 Root–Takahira Agreement
 Unequal treaty
 Battle of Namdaemun

Notes

References
 Korean Mission to the Conference on the Limitation of Armament, Washington, D.C., 1921-1922. (1922). Korea's Appeal to the Conference on Limitation of Armament. Washington: U.S. Government Printing Office. OCLC 12923609 
 United States. Dept. of State. (1919). Catalogue of treaties: 1814-1918. Washington: Government Printing Office. OCLC  3830508
Much of this article was translated from the equivalent article in the Japanese Wikipedia, as it was on September 5, 2006.

Japan–Korea relations
History of Korea
Korea under Japanese rule
Anti-Japanese sentiment in Korea
1907 in Japan
1907 in Korea
Japanese imperialism and colonialism
Treaties concluded in 1907
Treaties entered into force in 1907
Treaties of the Empire of Japan
Treaties of the Korean Empire
Bilateral treaties of Japan